My Brother, My Love is a 2018 Swiss drama film directed by Thomas Imbach. The film had its world premiere at the Locarno Film Festival in August 2018. It received the Zurich Film Prize 2018.

Premise
Sixteen-year-old Lena feels more attracted to her brother Noah than is usual among siblings. She tries to distract herself with Noah's friend Enis, but the impossible love becomes an obsession. She loses herself in daydreams and soon lives more in her imagination than in the real world. Finally she struggles to confess her love to her brother. However, the brother, frightened, rejects her. For Lena, a journey into the unknown begins.

Cast
 Zsofia Körös as Lena
 Francis Meier as Noah
 Milan Peschel as father
 Bettina Stucky as mother
 Morgane Ferru as Julia
 Nikola Šošic as Enis
 İlayda Akdoğan as Meriem
 Gonca de Haas as Ebru
 Erol Afşin as Mustafa

Background

My Brother, My Love is inspired by Imbach's biography, albeit strongly fictionalized. It is about a love that is filled with taboos in our society, about the sister's longing for her brother, which can only be lived as a delusion. In the film, Imbach focuses on the time of adolescence, when this passion first seeks fulfilment and has a thoroughly "healthy" origin.

Reception
Björn Hayer of the Neue Zürcher Zeitung wrote: "The boundaries between reality and wishful thinking are blurred in a sophisticated narrative structure, visually congenially implemented - Lena's perspective and her thoughts alone carry this extraordinary work".

Kino-Zeit stated: "A remarkably fearless film, a highlight in Locarno 2018".

References

External links
 
 

2018 films
2018 drama films
Films about siblings
Films shot in İzmir
Films shot in Zürich
2010s German-language films
Swiss drama films